This is a list of municipal poets laureate in the province of Ontario, Canada.

Barrie
The city of Barrie has had four poets laureate Tyneisha Ternent (2022 - present), Victoria Butler (2018 – 2022), Damian Lopes (2014 – 2018), and Dr. Bruce Meyer (2010-2014).

Brantford 
The city of Brantford named John B. Lee poet laureate in perpetuity in 2005.

Cobalt 
The town of Cobalt named Ann Margetson poet laureate

Cobourg 
Cobourg’s poets laureate are Jessica Outram (2019 – 2022), Ted Amsden (2011 – 2018), Jill Battson (2009 – 2011), and Eric Winter (1997 – 2009)

Dufferin County 
Dufferin County's poets laureate is Harry Posner (2017–present)

Kingston 
Kingston’s poets laureate are Jason Heroux (2019 – present), Helen Humphreys (2015 –  2019), and Eric Folsom (2011 – 2015).

London 
London’s poets laureate are Tom Cull (2016 – present), and Penn Kemp (2011 – 2013)

Mississauga 
Mississauga’s poets laureate program was created in 2015. Poets are required to produce at least three poems for city-determined events annually, and read at civic events. Most serve a 2-year term, with Ayomide Bayowa being assigned the role for 30 months, due to delays in selection due to the COVID-19 pandemic.

 2015–2017: Anna Yin
 2017–2019: Wali Shah
 2019–2021: Paul Edward Costa
 2021–2024: Ayomide Bayowa

Norfolk County 
In Norfolk County John B. Lee was appointed in 2011.

Ottawa 
Ottawa’s poets laureate are Albert Dumont (Anglophone) (2021-2022)  and Gilles Latour (Francophone) (2021-2022), Margaret Michèle Cook (Francophone) and Diana Young (Anglophone) (2019 – 2021), Andrée Lacelle (Francophone) and Jamaal Jackson Rogers (Anglophone) (2017 – 2019).

Owen Sound 
Owen Sound’s poets laureate are Richard-Yves Sitoski (2019 – 2022), Lauren Best (2017-2019), Rob Rolfe & Larry Jensen (2015 – 2017), Terry Burns (2013 – 2014), Kateri Akiwenzie-Damm (2011 – 2012), Kristan Anderson (2008 – 2010), Liz Zetlin (2007 – 2008).

Greater Sudbury 
Greater Sudbury’s poets laureate are Kyla Heming (2022-present), Vera Constantineau (2020-2022), Chloé LaDuchesse (2018 – 2020), Kim Fahner (2016 – 2018), Thomas Leduc (2014 – 2015), Daniel Aubin (2012 – 2013), and Roger Nash (2010 – 2011)

Toronto 
The Poet Laureate of Toronto program was established in 2001, naming Dennis Lee as the first poet laureate.  Successors include: A. F. Moritz (2019 – 2022), Anne Michaels (2016 – 2019), George Elliott Clarke (2012 – 2015), Dionne Brand (2009 – 2012), and Pier Giorgio Di Cicco (2004 – 2009).

The title of "Poet Laureate of Emery," referring to the Emery Village community in the former borough of North York, was created by then-Councillor Giorgio Mammoliti. Dr. Laurence Hutchman was given the title in 2017.

Windsor 
The city of Windsor poets laureate are Mary Ann Mulhern (2019 – 2022), Marty Gervais (2011 – 2019) and Vanessa Shields (April 2022- September 2022).

Woodstock 
The city of Woodstock posthumously named Barry C. Butson poet laureate emeritus.

See also

 Poet Laureate of Toronto
 Canadian Parliamentary Poet Laureate
 Municipal Poets Laureate in Alberta, Canada
 Municipal Poets Laureate in British Columbia, Canada

References

Poets Laureate of places in Canada